John Clempert (Siberia, April 19, 1878 – May 1940) was a Russian escape artist who became famous for his hanging tricks and for a legal dispute with Harry Houdini.

Early career
Clempert was born in Siberia on April 19, 1878, in a city Edwin A. Dawes indicated as “Poletavarr.” He started working in Farroni's Circus as a wrestler, but became famous as “The Man They Cannot Hang” for the acts of escapology he managed to perform after an assistant had hung him.

In 1903, however, one of his hanging performances failed in Rochester, New York, and the accident nearly costed Clempert his life. He abandoned the hanging tricks and joined the Warren American Circus, touring India and the Middle East.

Legal dispute with Houdini
The new acts Clempert performed were inspired by Houdini. He proposed new escapology acts evading handcuffs and chains, and advertised himself as “The Handcuff and Siberian Gaol Breaker.” He also believed he had identified how Houdini performed his “Milk Can Escape,” where he came out of a large, water-filled milk can. He started proposing his own version of the Milk Can Escape in the Warren shows, including in England. Houdini argued that the act was protected by copyright and sued Clempert.

Reportedly, Houdini was so upset that, when he heard that Clempert was previously known as “The Man They Cannot Hang,” he commented, “Perhaps this is a pity, for when one man gets work on another’s reputation and has the impudence to rub the facts home by exposing the methods of the originator, words are useless.” The case was settled in 1906, with Clempert apologizing to Houdini.

Late career
Dawes wrote that Clempert rarely performed after losing his court case with Houdini, and only resumed his career in 1927, after Houdini's death in 1926. However, in 2018, British author Derek Tait reported in his book The Great Illusionists that he had found evidence in British daily newspapers of regular performances Clempert and his wife Nellie offered throughout Great Britain between 1907 and 1914. Tait mentioned an act called “Escape from a Submarine,” a variation of Houdini's Milk Can Escape different enough to avoid copyright problems, and media coverage of Clempert's arrest in London on April 13, 1909, when the police prevented him from jumping handcuffed from the Tower Bridge.

There is also evidence in Houdini's papers that he continued to keep a watch on Clempert, and complained in 1910 that the Siberian's escape acts were still too similar to his own, and in 1912 that, after Houdini had appeared on stage seated in the pilot's seat of a real airplane, Clempert promptly did the same. Houdini's lawyers, however, found no ground for suing Clempert again.

Tait found less references to Clempert in British media after World War I, but one indicated that he was still performing with success in the 1930s. Clempert died in the month of May 1940, but neither Tait nor Dawes were able to find the exact date.

Clempert and Nellie had four children, David, Maurice, Zelda, and Aaron. Zelda became a screenwriter and playwright under the name Zelda Davees.

References

1878 births
1940 deaths
Magicians from the Russian Empire
Escapologists
People from Siberia
Emigrants from the Russian Empire to the United Kingdom